The Men of the Deeps are a male choral ensemble composed of former coal miners from Cape Breton Island, Nova Scotia.

History
Formed in 1966, the group has a mandate to preserve the traditional settler music and folklore of the Canadian Maritimes and particularly the Cape Breton region. As of 2006, only one member had been with the group since its inception, but other original members had returned after brief times out of the group. In this category are both a mine manager and a former president of District 26 of the United Mine Workers of America.

From the group's inception until his retirement in 2017, the musical director was John C. (Jack) O'Donnell, Professor Emeritus of music at St. Francis Xavier University in Antigonish, Nova Scotia. In 1983, O'Donnell's contribution was recognized by the government of Canada, as he was awarded the Order of Canada. In 1993, he was further honoured when he received an honorary Doctor of Letters from the University College of Cape Breton (now Cape Breton University), an honour that was bestowed upon the group as a whole in 2000. O'Donnell died October 25, 2018, age 83.

In 1977, the group became the first Canadian musical ensemble to tour the People's Republic of China. In 1999, they went to Kosovo and performed a concert on behalf of the United Nations Children's Fund.

Performances
The Men of the Deeps have toured most of the major cities in North America and have also performed concerts specifically for fellow miners during United Mine Workers of America conventions in Cincinnati and Denver. They have also released several albums on the Apex, Waterloo and Atlantica record labels. The group has appeared on numerous television programs including National Film Board of Canada short film featuring it in performance and a 2003 documentary by John Walker, which won a Gemini Award.

Discography 
 Men of the Deeps (1966)
 The Men of the Deeps I II & III (1976)
 Diamonds in the Rough (1992)
 Buried Treasures (1995)
 Coal Fire in Winter (1996)
 Mining the Soul (2000) (with Rita MacNeil)
 Their Lights Will Shine (2004)
 40 Years Young (2007)

References

Further reading
 MacGillivray, Allister. Diamonds in the Rough: 25 Years with The Men of the Deeps (1991). The Men of the Deeps Music.

External links 
 The Men of the Deeps Official website
 NFB Documentary - The Men of the Deeps
 Jack O'Donnell - Choral Arrangements

Musical groups established in 1966
Musical groups from Nova Scotia
Canadian choirs
Mining organizations
1966 establishments in Nova Scotia